Rufina Dmitrievna Nifontova (September 15, 1931 – November 27, 1994) was a Soviet and Russian theater and film actress. People's Artist of the USSR (1978).

Biography
Rufina Nifontova was born in Moscow on September 15, 1931 in a family with Greek roots.

The father – Dmitry Pitade (1891–1944), was an assistant to the chief of station Moscow-Sorting – attentive, gentle man. Mother – Darya Semyonovna (1895–1964), worked at a textile factory, was a shock worker-activist, had a martial character. Alexander's brother went missing in the early days of the Great Patriotic War. Brother Boris was also killed at the front. Brother Vyacheslav (1931–1975) – the twin Rufina.

She studied at the Gerasimov Institute of Cinematography (course of Bibikov-Pyzhova). In 1955 Rufina Nifontova graduated from VGIK and was admitted to the Theater-studio movie actor.

Since 1957 Nifontova comes into the troupe of the Maly Theatre. The Maly she came already famous actress.

In 1986–1991 – Secretary of the Board Union of Theatre Workers of the Russian Federation.

November 27, 1994 Rufina Nifontova came from the country, much shivering and wanted to bask in the bathroom to go to bed later. Water seemed cool actress: she turned the hot water, but a few minutes later fainted. Noticing streaks on the ceiling downstairs neighbors started knocking on the door, and then called her daughter Nifontova. When Olga and her husband came and opened the apartment, on the landing poured boiling water. Help Rufina Nifontova was impossible.

Personal life
Husband – Gleb Nifontov, filmmaker.
Daughter – Olga, graduated from the VGIK.

Awards
 1956 – Karlovy Vary International Film Festival (Award for Best Actress, for film Volnitsa)
 1958 – Laureate Union Film Festival in First prize for the actors of the 1958
 1960 – Laureate Union Film Festival in First prize for Best Actress for the 1960
 1962 – Honored Artist of the RSFSR
 1966 – People's Artist of the RSFSR
 1967 – Order of the Badge of Honour
 1974 – Order of the Red Banner of Labour
 1978 – People's Artist of the USSR
 1981 – Order of Friendship of Peoples

Selected filmography 
 1955 – Volnitsa as Nastya
1956 – Polyushko-polye as Valya Chernysheva
1957–1959 – The Road to Calvary as Katya Bulavina
 1965 – Year as Long as Life as Jenny Marx
 1965 – The First Visitor as Alexandra Kollontai
 1967 – They Live Nearby as Nadezhda Kalitina
 1968 – Intervention as Madame Tokarchuk
 1968 – Error of Honoré de Balzac as Ewelina Hańska
 1970 – Lyubov Yarovaya as Pavla Panova
 1970 – Semya Kotsyubinskikh as Vera Kotsyubinskaya
 1971 – Twenty Years Later as Duchesse de Chevreuse
 1980 – Gigolo and Gigolette as Eva Barrett
 1980 – Do Not Part with Your Beloved as judge
 1981 – Could One Imagine? as Tatyana Nikolayevna's mother
 1984 – Time and the Conways as Mrs. Conway
 1992 – Crazy Love as Anna Sergeyevna, as patient of lunatic asylum

References

External links

Могила Нифонтовой на Ваганьковском кладбище

1931 births
1994 deaths
20th-century Russian actresses
Communist Party of the Soviet Union members
Gerasimov Institute of Cinematography alumni
Honored Artists of the RSFSR
People's Artists of the RSFSR
People's Artists of the USSR
Recipients of the Order of Friendship of Peoples
Recipients of the Order of the Red Banner of Labour
Russian film actresses
Russian people of Greek descent
Russian stage actresses
Soviet film actresses
Soviet people of Greek descent
Soviet stage actresses
Burials at Vagankovo Cemetery